Hassan Ameen (Arabic:حسن أمين) (born 13 June 1985) is an Emirati footballer. He currently plays as a left back.

References

External links
 

Emirati footballers
1985 births
Living people
Al Wahda FC players
Al-Nasr SC (Dubai) players
Al Jazira Club players
Al-Wasl F.C. players
Fujairah FC players
Khor Fakkan Sports Club players
Emirates Club players
Masfout Club players
UAE First Division League players
UAE Pro League players
Association football fullbacks